Bomb squad most often refers to a team specialised in bomb disposal.

Bomb squad may also refer to:
 Bomb Squad, a former name of Suburban Legends, an American ska punk band
 Bomb Squad (video game), for the Intellivision game system
 The Bomb Squad, an American hip hop production team